Jack Stafford (born 11 July 1997) is an Irish rugby union player. He plays as a scrum-half for English Premiership Rugby side Harlequins.

Early life
Stafford was born in Wexford, Ireland and attended Glenstal Abbey School, where he was selected in the Munster Schools Team of the Year in 2014 and 2016. He represented Munster at Under-18 and Under-19 level.

Domestic career

Munster
Stafford made his senior competitive debut for Munster on 26 November 2017, coming off the bench to replace James Hart in the provinces 2017–18 Pro14 round 9 win against Zebre. He was released by province in June 2020 after completing the three-year academy cycle.

Harlequins
Stafford moved to England to join Premiership Rugby side Harlequins, in a move that was confirmed in August 2020. He had a two-week trail with the club during the summer, and signed a short-term contract until October 2020, which was later extended. Stafford made his debut for the club as a replacement in their 57–21 defeat at home to Ulster in the last 16 of the 2020–21 Challenge Cup on 4 April 2021.

Ireland
Stafford has played for Ireland Under-20s at the 2017 Six Nations Under 20 Championship and the 2017 World Rugby Under 20 Championship.

References

External links
Harlequins Profile
Munster Academy Profile
Pro14 Profile

U20 Six Nations Profile

Living people
1997 births
People educated at Glenstal Abbey School
Rugby union players from County Limerick
Irish rugby union players
Shannon RFC players
Munster Rugby players
Harlequin F.C. players
Rugby union scrum-halves
Irish expatriate rugby union players
Expatriate rugby union players in England
Irish expatriate sportspeople in England
Rugby union players from County Wexford